Starling Tucker (1770January 3, 1834) was a U.S. Representative from South Carolina. Born in Halifax County in the Province of North Carolina, Tucker moved to Mountain Shoals, South Carolina (now Enoree). He received a limited education.

Tucker held several local offices and served as member of the South Carolina House of Representatives. Tucker was elected as a Democratic-Republican to the Fifteenth Congress. He was reelected to the Sixteenth through Nineteenth Congresses and reelected as a Jacksonian to the Twentieth and Twenty-first Congresses (March 4, 1817 – March 3, 1831). He died in Mountain Shoals (now Enoree), South Carolina, January 3, 1834. He was interred in the private burial ground on the family estate west of Enoree, South Carolina.

Sources

1770 births
1834 deaths
People from Halifax County, North Carolina
Members of the South Carolina House of Representatives
Democratic-Republican Party members of the United States House of Representatives from South Carolina
Jacksonian members of the United States House of Representatives from South Carolina
19th-century American politicians